Mądrostki is a Polish coat of arms. It was used by several szlachta families in the times of the Polish–Lithuanian Commonwealth.

History

Earliest found mention is as of 1302.

Blazon

Notable bearers
Notable bearers of this coat of arms include:
1. Rodzina Mądrych (Mądry)

See also
 Polish heraldry
 Heraldry
 Coat of Arms
 List of Polish nobility coats of arms

External links
 Dynastic Genealogy
 Ornatowski.com

Polish coats of arms